Galactic Pot-Healer is a science fiction novel by American writer Philip K. Dick, first published in 1969. The novel deals with a number of philosophical and political issues such as repressive societies, fatalism, and the search for meaning in life.

Dick also wrote a children's book set in the same universe, Nick and the Glimmung, in 1966. It was published posthumously in 1988.

Plot introduction 
The story concerns a man who thanklessly heals pots in a totalitarian future Earth, only to be summoned by a godlike alien known as Glimmung, who has recruited him as part of a multispecies specialist team sent to "Plowman's Planet" (or Sirius Five) for a mystical quest, which is to raise the sunken cathedral of Heldscalla from a surreal alien ocean.

Plot summary
The novel opens in a dismal future America, the “Communal North American Citizen's Republic.”  The United States government has become extremely intrusive and repressive, monitoring the actions, speech and even thoughts of its citizens.

The protagonist, Joe Fernwright, is a pot-healer, one who can perfectly restore pottery to brand new condition.  Joe finds himself constantly depressed and idle at the opening of the novel. He is unemployed and on a war veteran's social security benefit, given that ceramic pottery has been replaced by plastics, and his profession is not in great demand.  He longs for purpose and meaning in life.  His one entertainment is to call various friends on the worldwide telephone network and swap puzzles. These puzzles are created by translating a common English proverb or phrase into another language by using a language translation computer, and then translating it back to English the same way. The object of the game is to guess the original from the double translation.

Joe finds meaning when he is summoned to "Plowman's Planet"/Sirius Five by a mysterious highly evolved alien, Glimmung, with seemingly godlike powers.  Along with other similarly talented but depressed and alienated people and creatures from all over the galaxy they are employed by Glimmung, in a grand endeavor to raise an ancient sunken cathedral from the ocean floor.

Glimmung is also in a struggle with the Kalends, a species gifted with precognition who are constantly writing a book that supposedly foretells the future, one which inevitably is proven right.  Glimmung is determined to continue with his struggle, even when the book predicts certain failure.

At the conclusion of the book, Fernwright and his companions are offered the opportunity to join a gestalt or hive mind that also encompasses Glimmung. Fernwright and an unnamed octopoid companion alone refuse the offer. Fernwright is then given various options, such as going back to earth, going with the octopoid to its planet, going to Mali's planet (a young humanoid female he had become romantically involved with and who chose to become a part of the collective conscious) or stay back on Sirius Five. The octopoid also suggests to him that he should start creating pots with the tools Glimmung has given him instead of just healing them. The story ends by saying the first pot he created was 'awful.'

Bibliographic information
Galactic Pot-Healer was originally published in 1969 by Berkley Medallion Books. A hardback edition was issued in 1969 by the Science Fiction Book Club (Nelson Doubleday, Inc.). It is currently published in the United States by Vintage Books, and in the United Kingdom by Gollancz.

An audiobook version of Galactic Pot-Healer was released in 1998 by Blackstone Audio. The audiobook is read by Tom Parker. Another version released in 2013 by Brilliance Audio, read by Phil Gigante, is unabridged and runs 6 hrs 10 minutes.

1969 American novels
1969 science fiction novels
American science fiction novels
Novels by Philip K. Dick
Berkley Books books
Dystopian novels
Unemployment in fiction
Novels set on fictional planets
Novels about mass surveillance
Fiction set around Sirius
Novels published posthumously